Lockheed Corp. v. Spink, 517 U.S. 882 (1996), is a US labor law case, concerning occupational pensions.

Facts
Mr Spink was denied full benefits from Lockheed Corporation after being rehired in 1988. He claimed that an amendment of the plan, to exclude people over 61, violated § 406(a)(1)(D) of the Employee Retirement Income Security Act of 1974 (ERISA), which prohibits a fiduciary from causing a plan to engage in a transaction that transfers plan assets to, or involves the use of plan assets for the benefit of, a party in interest.

Judgment
Justice Thomas, writing for the majority, ruled that employers could amend plans. They were not bound by fiduciary duties while acting as sponsors. 

Justices Breyer and Souter dissented in part, preferring to withhold expression of any view on the proposition that "the payment of benefits pursuant to an amended plan, regardless of what the plan requires of the employee in return for those benefits, does not constitute a prohibited transaction."

See also

United States labor law

References

External links
 

United States labor case law
United States Supreme Court cases
United States Supreme Court cases of the Rehnquist Court
Employee Retirement Income Security Act of 1974